Mohammad Hussain Mohammad Yusof (24 February 1918 – 9 April 2015) was one of the earliest teachers in Brunei Darussalam. He became known as the pioneer for the establishment of the Brunei Malay Teacher's Training College.

Background
Mohammad Hussain was born on 24 February 1918. His father was Mohammad Yusof and his mother was Dayang Siti Zaleha Binti Pehin Orang Kaya Maharaja Diraja Awang Mohammad Daud. During his childhood, he was self educated by his father, along with his siblings and nephews.

Education
Hussain began his training as a teacher in 1934. He went to further his education at the Sultan Idris Training College (SITC), Tanjung Malim, British Malaya, from 1937 until 1939.

Career
Upon completing his studies, Hussain began his service to the government of Brunei, as Assistant Teacher in 1939, at the Malay School in Muara. He was later promoted as headmaster of the same school in 1940. The following year, he was transferred to Tutong District, where he served at Tanjong Maya Malay School and Bukit Bendera Malay School.

After the Second World War, Hussain was again appointed as headmaster of the Bandar Brunei Malay School. In 1948, he was appointed as Group Teacher Supervisor for Brunei-Muara, Belait and Tutong District.

Brunei Malay Teacher's Training College
Hussain was known to be the founding father of the first Teacher's Training College which was formed around 1930s. The idea to form the college came when he was sent to Batu Lintang Malay Teacher's Training College in Kuching, Sarawak. After the establishment, he served the college as lecturer and Educational Inspector.

Retirement and death
Hussain retired from public services in 1973 while serving as Malay Language Educational Inspector. After his retirement, he continued to be active in the educational field, giving guidance and advice to younger generation.

Hussain died on Thursday, 9 April 2015, at the age of 96 at his house at Kampong Anggerek Desa, Bandar Seri Begawan. He was buried at Rangas Muslim Cemetery, Bandar Seri Begawan.

Honours
As a recognition to his services to the country, the Brunei Government conferred him several titles and honours. Among them was:

 Darjah Paduka Mahkota Brunei (3rd class)
 1997 Teacher's Day Award.

Family
Hussain was married to Khadijah binti Ahmad and had eight children.

References

1918 births
2015 deaths
Bruneian Muslims
Bruneian educators
Founders of educational institutions